Jinhai Power Station, also known as Jinhai Power Plant or Jinhai Generating Plant, is a Chinese generating plant located at Beihai, Guangxi,  with a total installed capacity of 42,000 kilowatts. The total investment of the project is 28.5 million US dollars.

History
On August 30, 1989, groundbreaking for the Jinhai Power Station took place. The generating plant covers an area of 31,500 square meters, with a construction area of 6,000 square meters, and a total investment of $12.5 million for the first phase of the plant.  

On August 28, 1990, Jinhai Power Station was put into operation.

References 

1990 establishments in China
Energy infrastructure completed in 1990
Oil-fired power stations in China